Welch Township may refer to the following townships in the United States:

 Welch Township, Goodhue County, Minnesota
 Welch Township, Cape Girardeau County, Missouri